Heinz Becker (1915–1991) was a German-American baseball player.

Heinz Becker may also refer to:
 Heinz K. Becker (born 1950), Austrian politician
 Heinz Becker (musicologist) (1922–2006), German composer and musicologist

See also
Karl-Heinz Becker (disambiguation)